Junger is a surname. Notable people with the surname include:

Egidius Junger (1833–1895), German clergyman
Ernst Junger (1895–1998), German soldier and author
Gil Junger (born 1954), American director 
Paul Junger Witt (born 1941), American producer
Peter Junger (1933–2006), American computer law professor and Internet activist
Sebastian Junger (born 1962), American author

See also
Junger v. Daley, court case brought by Peter D. Junger 
Junger Tag, German song title for the Eurovision Song Contest 1973
Jünger (disambiguation)
Jungers (disambiguation)